Veprecula sykesii is a species of sea snail, a marine gastropod mollusk in the family Raphitomidae.

Description

Distribution
This species occurs in the Gulf of Oman.

References

External links
 Biolib.cz: image
  Melvill J.C. (1917). A revision of the Turridae (Pleurotomidae) occurring in the Persian Gulf, Gulf of Oman, and North Arabian Sea, as evidenced mostly through the results of dredgings carried out by Mr. F. W. Townsend, 1893–1914. Proceedings of the Malacological Society of London. 12(4): 140-186, pls 8-10
 

sykesii
Gastropods described in 1903